James Joseph Knobeloch (born March 18, 1950) is an American-Australian actor best known for his role as Jake Slicker on Dr. Quinn, Medicine Woman.

He was formerly married to Beth Sullivan, an American film and television writer and producer, best known as the creator of the long-running CBS series Dr. Quinn, Medicine Woman, in which Knobeloch appeared. They have two children, Tess and Jack, who live in northern California with their mother.

Knobeloch has been a permanent resident of Australia since 2001.

Since taking up residency in Australia, he has appeared in a number of Australian films and television series.

He appeared as a studio executive in Peter Jackson’s King Kong, and in 2012 he starred as Dr. Belfort in Predestination  He later appeared in the Adult Swim series Smiling Friends.

Knobeloch also appeared as Texan Jim in The BBQ.

Knobeloch has also appeared in a number of Australian television series including The Saddle Club, Angry Boys and Australia on Trial, a three-part ABC Television series featuring re-enactments of historical events.  The episode of Australia on Trial in which Knobeloch appeared centred on the Myall Creek massacre, where he played magistrate Robert Scott. He then went on to play the role of an American Dad on the Australian television comedy series Superwog

References

External links

1950 births
Male actors from Illinois
American male television actors
Living people
People from Belleville, Illinois